The Shung Ye Museum of Formosan Aborigines is a museum located just 200 meters diagonally across from the National Palace Museum in Shilin District, Taipei, Taiwan. It houses exhibits relating to the cultures and histories of the Taiwanese aborigines. The aboriginal tribes live mainly in the mountainous east and south of Taiwan and have historically spoken a variety of Austronesian languages, so it was thought important to have a central location in the capital where their cultures could be on display.  Both permanent and rotating exhibits are a part of the museum.

Architecture
The museum is notable for its architectural design, featuring a 13.2 x 1.1 meters (43 x 3.6 feet) white granite totem pole at the entrance. The museum consists of man and nature exhibition area, lifestyle and implements, tools and weapon exhibition area, clothing, ornaments and culture exhibition area and floor beliefs and ceremonies exhibition area which are housed in a 4-story building.

See also
 List of museums in Taiwan

Footnotes

References
 Guidebook (2011): Shung Ye Museum of Formosan Aborigines Guidebook. .
 Blundell (2009): Austronesian Taiwan: Linguistics•History•Ethnology•Prehistory. Revised Edition. Edited by David Blundell. SMC publishing, Taiwan.  (paper).

External links

 Museum website
 Description of the museum
 Another description of the museum
 
  

1994 establishments in Taiwan
Ethnic museums in Taiwan
Museums established in 1994
Museums in Taipei
Taiwanese aboriginal culture and history